This Christmas Celebrate Me Home is a Christmas album by Beverley Mahood, released on November 4, 2008.

Track listing

Beverley Mahood albums
2008 Christmas albums
Christmas albums by Canadian artists
Country Christmas albums